Mudasarlova Reservoir is a reservoir in Visakhapatnam which covers  and has a flow of 1.5MGD (millions of gallons per day). The Government of Andhra Pradesh built a floating solar power plant with a 2MW capacity on the reservoir.

References

Reservoirs in Visakhapatnam
Reservoirs in Andhra Pradesh
Geography of Visakhapatnam
Solar power stations in Andhra Pradesh
Year of establishment missing